Yann Romain Barthès (born 9 October 1974) is a French journalist, TV presenter and producer, best known for hosting the television programme Le Petit Journal and Quotidien.

Life and career
Barthès first studied English at the University of Savoy in Chambéry before reorienting to journalism by integrating, between 1995 and 1998, the "Sciences of Information and Communication Institute" at the Bordeaux Montaigne University, in Bordeaux. Barthès became a journalist in 2002 on the show + clair, a weekly program dealing with media issues, which aired on Saturday afternoons on Canal +.

In 2004, he joined Le Grand Journal, for which he presented a nightly segment entitled Le Petit Journal People (The Little News Report - Celebrities). From 2007, he also presented Le Petit Journal Actu (The Little News Report - Current Events). In 2011, Le Petit Journal became a separate program, with Barthès as the main presenter. On 9 May 2016, it was announced that Barthès would be leaving the show after 23 June 2016. On the same day it was announced that Barthès and his team would begin two new programmes to be broadcast on the channels TMC and TF1 later in the year. The daily show Quotidien was first broadcast on TMC on 12 September 2016.

TV shows
2004 - 2016 : 
 Le Petit Journal - Canal+

Since 2016 :
 Quotidien - TMC
 Quotidien Express - TMC

Variations of Quotidien :
 Les Q d'Or (2016) - TMC
 Le Tattoo Show (2017) - TMC
 Le Toutou Matou Show (2017) - TMC
 Le Tif Show (2017) - TMC
 Le Summer Show (2017) - TMC
 Les Q d'Or 2017 (2017) - TMC

References

1974 births
Living people
People from Chambéry
French journalists
French television journalists
Université Savoie-Mont Blanc alumni